The 1919–20 Irish Cup was the 40th edition of the premier knock-out cup competition in Irish football. 

Shelbourne won the tournament for the 3rd time. They had defeated Glenavon in the semi-final, but crowd trouble marred the replay of the second semi-final between Belfast Celtic and Glentoran, and both clubs were subsequently expelled from the competition. Shelbourne were subsequently declared winners of the cup.

Results

First round

|}

Quarter-finals

|}

Replay

|}

Semi-finals

|}

Replay

|}

1Following crowd trouble at the semi-final replay at Solitude, both Belfast Celtic and Glentoran were expelled from the competition and Shelbourne were declared winners of the cup.

References

External links
 Northern Ireland Cup Finals. Rec.Sport.Soccer Statistics Foundation (RSSSF)

Irish Cup seasons
1919–20 domestic association football cups
1919–20 in Irish association football